The Mekong Delta ( or simply ), also known as the Western Region or South-western region, is the region in southwestern Vietnam where the Mekong River approaches and empties into the sea through a network of distributaries. The size of the area covered by water depends on the season. Its wet coastal geography makes it an important source of agriculture and aquaculture for the country.

The delta has been occupied as early as the 4th century BC. As a product of Khmer, Vietnamese, Chinese, and French settlement in the region, the delta and its waterways have numerous names, including the Khmer term Bassac to refer to the lower basin and the largest river branch flowing through it. 
After the 1954 Geneva Conference, Vietnam was split into two with South Vietnam inheriting the southern half of Vietnam becoming the State of Vietnam and eventually the Republic of Vietnam, also known as South Vietnam, with their own administrative states (see :Category:Provinces of South Vietnam). After 1975, the Mekong Delta ceased being a part of the Republic of Vietnam, succeeded by the current Vietnamese nation. Today, the region comprises 12 provinces: Long An, Đồng Tháp, Tiền Giang, An Giang, Bến Tre, Vĩnh Long, Trà Vinh, Hậu Giang, Kiên Giang, Sóc Trăng, Bạc Liêu, and Cà Mau, along with the province-level municipality of Cần Thơ.

The Mekong Delta has been dubbed a 'biological treasure trove'. Over 1,000 animal species were recorded between 1997 and 2007 and new species of plants, fish, lizards, and mammals have been discovered in previously unexplored areas, including the Laotian rock rat, thought to be extinct. The low-lying coastal geography of the region makes it vulnerable to climate change caused sea level rise, alongside related issues such as coastal erosion and saltwater intrusion.

History

Funan and Chenla period

The Mekong Delta was likely inhabited long since prehistory; the civilizations of Funan and Chenla maintained a presence in the Mekong Delta for centuries. Archaeological discoveries at Óc Eo and other Funanese sites show that the area was an important part of the Funan civilization, bustling with trading ports and canals as early as in the first century AD and extensive human settlement in the region may have gone back as far as the 4th century BC. While there is no clear consensus on the ethnic makeup of those living in the region during the Funan, archaeologists suggest that they may have had connections to Austroasiatic people. Khmer inscriptions appear during the Chenla period.

Angkor Borei is a site in the Mekong Delta that existed between 400 BC-500 AD. This site had extensive maritime trade networks throughout Southeast Asia and with India, and is believed to have possibly been the ancient capital to the civilization of Funan.

Cambodian period

Together with Southeast (Vietnam), the region was known as Kampuchea Krom (Lower Cambodia) to the Khmer Empire, which likely maintained settlements there centuries before its rise in the 11th and 12th centuries. The kingdom of Champa, though mainly based along the coast of modern Central Vietnam, is known to have expanded west into the Mekong Delta, seizing control of Prey Nokor (the precursor to modern-day Ho Chi Minh City) by the end of the 13th century. Author Nghia M. Vo suggests that a Cham presence may indeed have existed in the area prior to Khmer occupation. However, this does not take into account that Kampuchea Krom (including Prey Nokor) existed since early history or at least Funan (Salkin et al., 1996); and the fact that between 10th-12th century, there were several clashes between Khmer Empire and Champa (mainly based along modern Central Vietnam).

In the early 15th century, Champa began mounting several incursions in the Mekong Delta. The declining Kingdom of Cambodia asked the Chinese Ming Empire for intervention in 1408 and 1414. Despite that, in 1421 Indravarman VI of Champa seized and annexed the eastern part of the Mekong Delta, including the marketplace town of Bien Hoa. He installed a statue of Tribhuvanākrānta (Visnu) there to mark the southern most extent of Champa.

Beginning in the 1620s, Cambodian king Chey Chettha II (1618–1628) allowed the Vietnamese to settle in the area, and to set up a custom house at Prey Nokor, which they colloquially referred to as Sài Gòn. The Mekong Delta became a territorial dispute between the Cambodians and the Vietnamese in the succeeding centuries. In 1757, Vietnamese lords had acquired control of Cà Mau. By the 1860s, French colonists had established control over the Mekong Delta and established the colony of French Cochinchina.

Vietnamese period

In 1698, the Nguyễn lords of Huế sent Nguyễn Hữu Cảnh, a Vietnamese noble, to the area to establish Vietnamese administrative structures in the area. Rather than a state narratives of Vietnamese majorities’ expansion to the South, French, Vietnamese documents, and the (Cambodian) Cham people regard themselves as the earliest settlers in the Mekong Delta in the 17th and 18th centuries, preceded Chinese and Vietnamese settlers. The Nguyen first established Cham–Malay military colonies in order to create establishment and control over the delta for later Vietnamese settlements. By the late 18th century when conditions were well-settled, those Cham–Malay settlers were gradually replaced by Vietnamese colonists. Vietnamese seizures of indigenous lands and colonization of the Mekong Delta were later incorporated into the modern ethnonationalist Nam tiến theory. During the Tây Sơn wars and the subsequent Nguyễn dynasty, Vietnam's boundaries were pushed as far as the Cape Cà Mau. In 1802 Nguyễn Ánh crowned himself emperor Gia Long and unified all the territories comprising modern Vietnam, including the Mekong Delta.

Upon the conclusion of the Cochinchina Campaign in the 1860s, the area became part of Cochinchina, France's first colony in Vietnam, and later, part of French Indochina. Beginning during the French colonial period, the French patrolled and fought on the waterways of the Mekong Delta region with their Divisions navales d'assaut (Dinassaut), a tactic which lasted throughout the First Indochina War, and was later employed by the US Navy Mobile Riverine Force. During the Vietnam War—also referred to as the Second Indochina War—the Delta region saw savage fighting between Viet Cong (NLF) guerrillas and the US 9th Infantry Division and units of the United States Navy's swift boats and hovercraft (PACVs) plus the Army of the Republic of Vietnam 7th, 9th, and 21st Infantry Divisions. As a military region the Mekong Delta was encompassed by the IV Corps Tactical Zone (IV CTZ).

In 1975, North Vietnamese soldiers and Viet Cong soldiers launched a massive invasion in many parts of South Vietnam. While I, II, and III Corps collapsed significantly, IV Corps was still highly intact due to under Major General Nguyen Khoa Nam overseeing strong military operations to prevent VC taking over any important regional districts. Brigadier General Le Van Hung, the head of 21st Division commander, stayed office in Can Tho to continue defending successfully against VC. On 29 April 1975, the last U.S. Consul General Terry McNamara and his diplomats evacuated by marine boat from Can Tho to the South China Sea. When the South Vietnamese President Duong Van Minh ordered unconditional surrender, both ARVN generals in Can Tho, General Le Van Hung and Nguyen Khoa Nam, committed suicide. At Binh Thuy Air Base some ARVN soldiers and air base personnel who defended the air base were evacuated by helicopters and several jet fighters to Thailand shortly after hearing Minh's surrender. Within hours, VC soldiers occupied the base and captured those ARVN and air base personnel who didn't escape. In My Tho, Brigadier General Tran Van Hai, who was in charged protecting National Highway 4 (now NH1A) from Saigon to Can Tho, committed suicide. Tran was one of the three ARVN generals who refused to be evacuated by American when the North Vietnamese soldiers invaded Saigon. Several ARVN soldiers continued to fight against the VC but later either surrendered or disbanded when faced with VC counterattacks.

In the late 1970s, the Khmer Rouge regime attacked Vietnam in an attempt to reconquer the Delta region. This campaign precipitated the Vietnamese invasion of Cambodia and subsequent downfall of the Khmer Rouge.

Geography

The Mekong Delta, as a region, lies immediately to the west of Ho Chi Minh City (also called Saigon by locals), roughly forming a triangle stretching from Mỹ Tho in the east to Châu Đốc and Hà Tiên in the northwest, down to Cà Mau at the southernmost tip of Vietnam, and including the island of Phú Quốc.

The Mekong Delta region of Vietnam displays a variety of physical landscapes, but is dominated by flat flood plains in the south, with a few hills in the north and west. This diversity of terrain was largely the product of tectonic uplift and folding brought about by the collision of the Indian and Eurasian tectonic plates about 50 million years ago. The soil of the lower Delta consists mainly of sediment from the Mekong and its tributaries, deposited over thousands of years as the river changed its course due to the flatness of the low-lying terrain.

The present Mekong Delta system has two major distributary channels, both discharging directly into the East Sea. The Holocene history of the Mekong Delta shows delta progradation of about 200 km during the last 6 kyr. During the Middle Holocene the Mekong River was discharging waters into both the East Sea and the Gulf of Thailand. The water entering the Gulf of Thailand was flowing via a palaeochannel located within the western part of the delta; north of the Camau Peninsula.
Upper Pleistocene prodeltaic and delta front sediments interpreted as the deposits of the palaeo-Mekong River were reported from central basin of the Gulf of Thailand

The Mekong Delta is the region with the smallest forest area in Vietnam.  or 7.7% of the total area are forested as of 2011. The only provinces with large forests are Cà Mau Province and Kiên Giang Province, together accounting for two-thirds of the region's forest area, while forests cover less than 5% of the area of all of the other eight provinces and cities.

Coastal erosion

From 1973 to 2005, the Mekong Delta's seaward shoreline growth decreased gradually from a mean of 7.8 m/yr to 2.8 m/yr, becoming negative after 2005, with a retreat rate of −1.4 m/yr. The net deltaic land area gain has also been slowing, with the mean rate decreasing from 4.3 km2/yr (1973–1979) to 1.0 km2 yr (1995–2005), and then to −0.05 km2/yr (2005–2015). Thus, in about 2005, the subaerial Mekong Delta transitioned from a constructive mode to an erosional (or destructive) mode.

Climate change concerns
Being a low-lying coastal region, the Mekong Delta is particularly susceptible to floods resulting from rises in sea level due to climate change. The Climate Change Research Institute at Cần Thơ University, in studying the possible consequences of climate change, has predicted that, besides suffering from drought brought on by seasonal decrease in rainfall, many provinces in the Mekong Delta will be flooded by the year 2030. Plans are currently being made to breach dykes in the upper Mekong delta, as a sedimentation enhancing strategy. This will not only increase the water retention capacity of the upper delta region, alleviating pressure on the lower delta, but also reintroduce sediment-rich water which may result in land elevation. Another problem caused by climate change is the increasing soil salinity near the coasts. Bến Tre Province is planning to reforest coastal regions to counter this trend.

The duration of inundations at an important road in the city of Can Tho is expected to continue to rise from the current total of 72 inundated days per year to 270 days by 2030 and 365 days by 2050. This is attributed to the combined influence of sea-level rise and land subsidence, which occurs at about  annually.
Several projects and initiatives on local, regional and state levels work to counter this trend and save the Mekong Delta. For example, there exists a programme for integrated coastal management that is supported by Germany and Australia.

It is expected that a majority of the delta will be below sea level by 2050.

Demographics

The inhabitants of the Mekong Delta region are predominantly ethnic Vietnamese. It is home to the largest population of Cambodians outside of Cambodia. The Khmer minority population live primarily in the Trà Vinh, Sóc Trăng, and Muslim Chăm in Tân Châu, An Giang provinces. There are also sizeable Hoa (ethnic Chinese) populations in the Kiên Giang, and Trà Vinh provinces. The region had a population of 17.33 million people in 2011.

The population of the Mekong Delta has been growing relatively slowly in recent years, mainly due to out-migration. The region's population only increased by 471,600 people between 2005 and 2011, while 166,400 people migrated out in 2011 alone. Together with the central coast regions, it has one of the slowest growing populations in the country. Population growth rates have been between 0.3% and 0.5% between 2008 and 2011, while they have been over 2% in the neighbouring southeastern region. Net migration has been negative in all of these years. The region also has a relatively low fertility rate, at 1.8 children per woman in 2010 and 2011, down from 2.0 in 2005.

Provinces

Economy

The Mekong Delta is by far Vietnam's most productive region in agriculture and aquaculture, while its role in industry and foreign direct investment (FDI) is much smaller.

Agriculture
2.6 million ha in the Mekong Delta are used for agriculture, which is one fourth of Vietnam's total. Due to its mostly flat terrain and few forested areas (except for Cà Mau Province), almost two-thirds (64.5%) of the region's land can be used for agriculture. The share of agricultural land exceeds 80% in Cần Thơ and neighbouring Hậu Giang Province and is below 50% only in Cà Mau Province (32%) and Bạc Liêu Province (42%). The region's land used for growing cereals makes up 47% of the national total, more than northern and central Vietnam combined. Most of this is used for rice cultivation.

Rice output in 2011 was 23,186,000t, 54.8% of Vietnam's total output. The strongest producers are Kiên Giang Province, An Giang Province, and Đồng Tháp Province, producing over 3 million tonnes each and almost 11 million tonnes together. Any two of these provinces produce more than the entire Red River Delta. Only three provinces produce less than 1 million tonnes of rice (Bạc Liêu Province, Cà Mau Province, Bến Tre Province).

Fishery
The Mekong Delta is also Vietnam's most important fishing region. It has almost half of Vietnam's capacity of offshore fishing vessels (mostly in Kien Gian with almost 1/4, Bến Tre, Cà Mau, Tiền Giang, Bạc Liêu). Fishery output was at 3.168 million tons (58.3% of Vietnam) and has experienced rapid growth from 1.84mt in 2005. All of Vietnam's largest fishery producers with over 300kt of output are in the Mekong Delta: Kiên Giang, Cà Mau, Đồng Tháp, An Giang, and Bến Tre.

Despite the region's large offshore fishing fleet, 2/3 (2.13 million tonnes out of Vietnam's total of 2.93) of fishery output actually comes from aquaculture.

December 2015, aquaculture production was estimated at 357 thousand tons, up 11% compared to the same period last year, bringing the total aquaculture production 3516 thousand tons in 2015, up 3.0% compared to the same period. Although aquaculture production has increased overall, aquaculture still faces many difficulties coming from export markets.

Industry and FDI

The Mekong Delta is not strongly industrialized, but is still the third out of seven regions in terms of industrial gross output. The region's industry accounts for 10% of Vietnam's total as of 2011. Almost half of the region's industrial production is concentrated in Cần Thơ, Long An Province and Cà Mau Province. Cần Thơ is the economic center of the region and more industrialized than the other provinces. Long An has been the only province of the region to attract part of the manufacturing booming around Ho Chi Minh City and is seen by other provinces as an example of successful FDI attraction. Cà Mau Province is home to a large industrial zone including power plants and a fertiliser factory.

Accumulated foreign direct investment in the Mekong Delta until 2011 was $10.257bn. It has been highly concentrated in a few provinces, led by Long An and Kiên Giang with over $3bn each, Tiền Giang and Cần Thơ (around 850m), Cà Mau (780m) and Hậu Giang (673m), while the other provinces have received less than 200m each. In general, the performance of the region in attracting FDI is evaluated as unsatisfactory by local analysts and policymakers. 
Companies from Ho Chi Minh City have also invested heavily in the region. Their investment from 2000 to June 2011 accounted for 199 trillion VND (almost $10bn).

Infrastructure

The construction of the Cần Thơ Bridge, a cable-stayed bridge over the largest distributary of the Mekong River, was completed on April 12, 2010, three years after a collapse that killed 54 and injured nearly 100 workers. The bridge replaces the ferry system that currently runs along National Route 1, and links Vĩnh Long Province and Cần Thơ city. The cost of construction is estimated to be 4.842 trillion Vietnamese đồng (approximately 342.6 million United States dollars), making it the most expensive bridge in Vietnam.

Culture

Life in the Mekong Delta revolves much around the river, and many of the villages are often accessible by rivers and canals rather than by road.

The region is home to cải lương, a form of Kinh/Vietnamese folk opera. Cai Luong Singing appeared in Mekong Delta in the early 20th century. Cai Luong Singing is often performed in the soundtrack of guitar and zither. Cai Luong is a kind of play telling a story. A sort of play often includes two main parts: the dialogue part and the singing part to express their thoughts and emotions.

Cuisine
The Mekong Delta cuisine relies heavily on fresh products which is abundant in the new land with heavy use of seafoods and unique ingredients of the region such as palm sugar, basa fish and wild herbs and flowers such as điên điển, so đũa, kèo nèo. The history of the region being a newly settled area reflects on its cuisine, with Ẩm thực khẩn hoang or Settlers cuisine means dishes are prepared fresh from wild and newly-caught ingredients. The cuisine is also influenced by Khmer, Cham and Chinese settlers. This differs itself from the cuisine of other regions of Vietnam.

Literature and movies
Nguyễn Ngọc Tư, an author from Cà Mau province, has written many popular books about life in the Mekong Delta such as:

Ngọn đèn không tắt (The Inextinguishable Light, 2000)
Ông ngoại (Grandpa, 2001)
Biển người mênh mông (The Ocean of People, 2003)
Giao thừa (New Year's Eve, 2003)
Nước chảy mây trôi (Flowing Waters, Flying Clouds, 2004)
Cánh đồng bất tận (The Endless Field, 2005)

The 2004 film The Buffalo Boy is set in Cà Mau province.

See also
GMS Environment Operations Center
Greater Mekong Sub-region Academic and Research Network
Mekong Basin Disease Surveillance

Notes

References

Further reading
Renaud, F. G. and C. Kuenzer (2012): The Mekong Delta System. Interdisciplinary Analyses of a River Delta (=Springer Environmental Science and Engineering). Dordrecht: Springer. .
Kuenzer, C. and F. G. Renaud (2012): Climate Change and Environmental Change in River Deltas Globally. In: Renaud, F. G. and C. Kuenzer (eds.): The Mekong Delta System. Interdisciplinary Analyses of a River Delta (=Springer Environmental Science and Engineering). Dordrecht: Springer, pp. 7–48.
Renaud F. G. and C. Kuenzer (2012): Introduction. In: Renaud, F. G. and C. Kuenzer (eds.): The Mekong Delta System. Interdisciplinary Analyses of a River Delta (=Springer Environmental Science and Engineering). Dordrecht: Springer, pp. 3–6.
Moder, F., C. Kuenzer, Z. Xu, P. Leinenkugel and Q. Bui Van (2012): IWRM for the Mekong Basin. In: Renaud, F. G. and C. Kuenzer (eds.): The Mekong Delta System. Interdisciplinary Analyses of a River Delta (=Springer Environmental Science and Engineering). Dordrecht: Springer, pp. 133–166.
Klinger, V., G. Wehrmann, G. Gebhardt and C. Kuenzer (2012): A Water related Web-based Information System for the Sustainable Development of the Mekong Delta. In: Renaud, F. G. and C. Kuenzer (eds.): The Mekong Delta System. Interdisciplinary Analyses of a River Delta (=Springer Environmental Science and Engineering). Dordrecht: Springer, pp. 423–444.
Gebhardt, S., L. D. Nguyen and C. Kuenzer (2012): Mangrove Ecosystems in the Mekong Delta. Overcoming Uncertainties in Inventory Mapping Using Satellite Remote Sensing Data. In: Renaud, F. G. and C. Kuenzer (eds.): The Mekong Delta System. Interdisciplinary Analyses of a River Delta (=Springer Environmental Science and Engineering). Dordrecht: Springer, pp. 315–330.
Kuenzer, C., H. Guo, J. Huth, P. Leinenkugel, X. Li and S. Dech (2013): Flood Mapping and Flood Dynamics of the Mekong Delta. ENVISAT-ASAR-WSM Based Time-Series Analyses. In: Remote Sensing 5, pp. 687–715. DOI: 10.3390/rs5020687.
Gebhardt, S., J. Huth, N. Lam Dao, A. Roth and C. Kuenzer (2012): A comparison of TerraSAR-X Quadpol backscattering with RapidEye multispectral vegetation indices over rice fields in the Mekong Delta, Vietnam. In: International Journal of Remote Sensing 33 (24), pp. 7644–7661.
Leinenkugel, P., T. Esch and C. Kuenzer (2011): Settlement detection and impervious surface estimation in the Mekong Delta using optical and SAR remote sensing data. In: Remote Sensing of Environment 115 (12), pp. 3007–3019.
Kuenzer, C., I. Klein, T. Ullmann, E. Foufoula-Georgiou, R. Baumhauer and S. Dech (2015): Remote Sensing of River Delta Inundation: Exploiting the Potential of Coarse Spatial Resolution, Temporally-Dense MODIS Time Series. In: Remote Sensing 7, pp. 8516-8542. DOI: 10.3390/rs70708516.
Kuenzer, C., H. Guo, I. Schlegel, V. Tuan, X. Li and S. Dech (2013): Varying scale and capability of envisat ASAR-WSM, TerraSAR-X scansar and TerraSAR-X Stripmap data to assess urban flood situations: A case study of the mekong delta in Can Tho province. In: Remote Sensing 5 (10), pp. 5122-5142. DOI: 10.3390/rs5105122.

External links
The WISDOM Project, a Water related Information System for the Mekong Delta
Image Google map of the Mekong Delta.
Fruits found at Mekong Delta

Climate change
Mekong Delta Climate Change Forum 2009 Documents. International Centre for Environmental Management.
Release of arsenic to deep groundwater in the Mekong Delta, Vietnam, linked to pumping-induced land subsidence.

 
Mekong River
Saigon River
River deltas of Asia
Landforms of Vietnam
Regions of Vietnam
Biosphere reserves of Vietnam
Landforms of the South China Sea
Landforms of An Giang province
Landforms of Bạc Liêu province
Landforms of Bến Tre province
Landforms of Cà Mau province
Landforms of Đồng Tháp province
Landforms of Hậu Giang province
Landforms of Kiên Giang province
Landforms of Long An province
Landforms of Sóc Trăng province
Landforms of Tiền Giang province
Landforms of Trà Vinh province
Landforms of Vĩnh Long province
Landforms of Cần Thơ